Gamocarpha is a genus of flowering plants in the family Calyceraceae, native to the Andes of Chile and Argentina. It has been proposed to synonymize the genus Nastanthus within Gamocarpha.

Species
Currently accepted species include:

Gamocarpha alpina (Poepp. ex Less.) H.V.Hansen
Gamocarpha angustifolia Phil.
Gamocarpha dentata Phil.
Gamocarpha gilliesii Miers
Gamocarpha ligulata Miers
Gamocarpha polycephala Phil.
Gamocarpha selliana Reiche

References

Calyceraceae
Asterales genera